United States v. Georgia, 546 U.S. 151 (2006), was a United States Supreme Court case in which the Court decided that the protection of Americans with Disabilities Act of 1990 (ADA), passed by the U.S. Congress, extends to persons held in a state prison and protects prison inmates from  discrimination on the basis of disability by prison personnel. Specifically, the court held that Title II of the Americans with Disabilities Act of 1990, ., is a proper use of Congressional power under the Fourteenth Amendment, Section 5,  making it applicable  to  prison system officials.

Facts of the case
The petitioner, Tony Goodman, a paraplegic prisoner using a wheelchair, sued the State of Georgia and others alleging that the conditions of his confinement in the Georgia state prison system violated ADA.  Goodman stated  that, because of his disability, he was kept in his cell for twenty-three hours per day, a cell too narrow for him to move his wheelchair, and denied access to medical treatment, such as catheters, treatment for bed sores and boils and access to mental health care, and to other privileges granted to prison inmates, such as access to programs, classes, and religious activities. Further, he claimed the prison was not handicapped accessible. For example, the prison did not make toilet and bathing facilities accessible to him, such that he was occasionally  forced to sit in his own human waste. He was also injured  multiple times while trying to transfer from his wheelchair to the shower or toilet himself, as assistance in these matters  was denied.

The position of Georgia was that state prisons were immune from suit  for damages, claiming that the U.S. Congress had exceeded its constitutional authority in authorizing suits for damages against states under ADA.

Decision
The Supreme Court was unanimous in its decision. It narrowly ruled  that Congress  has the authority to apply ADA to  the administration of  state prisons to the extent that it relates to conduct that actually violates the Fourteenth Amendment. Thus Congress was granted more authority over the States in this area of disability rights.

See also
List of United States Supreme Court cases, volume 546
List of United States Supreme Court cases

Notes

External links
 

United States Supreme Court cases
United States Eleventh Amendment case law
United States disability case law
2006 in United States case law
Legal history of Georgia (U.S. state)
United States Supreme Court cases of the Roberts Court